The Autostrada A1, nicknamed Autostrada del Sole ("Sun Motorway"), is the oldest European Highway and the most important in Italy. The highway links the largest cities on the Tyrrhenian side of Italy: Milan, Bologna, Florence, Rome and Naples. At 754 km, it is the longest Italian autostrada, running parallel to Autostrada Adriatica A14. It is a part of the E35 and E45 European routes.

The A1 reduced travel time between Milan and Naples from two days to just seven to eight hours.
The mountain crossing from Bologna to Florence is known as Variante di Valico.

History
Throughout the 1950s and 1960s, successive administrations wanted this major infrastructure project to be completed as quickly as possible, as it would be a great boost for the national economy. Construction began in 1956, and the highway was opened to traffic by then-prime minister Aldo Moro on 4 October 1964.

The section between Rome and Naples was originally designated A2, but it was incorporated into A1 following the opening of the bypass from Fiano Romano to San Cesareo on 21 July 1988.

Route

External links

A01
Transport in Lombardy
Transport in Emilia-Romagna
Transport in Tuscany
Transport in Umbria
Transport in Lazio
Transport in Campania